Yeghegnut (until 1947 Ghamishlu; before 1947 Sefiabad, Molla Badal, and Badal), is a village in the Armavir Province of Armenia. The majority of the village are Armenians (70%) with 663 (around 30%) of the Yazidi minority.

See also 
Armavir Province
Yazidis in Armenia

References 

World Gazeteer: Armenia – World-Gazetteer.com

Populated places in Armavir Province
Yazidi villages
Yazidi populated places in Armenia